Five O'Clock Heroes are a new wave influenced indie rock band currently based in New York City. Lead singer Antony Ellis is originally from Northampton in the UK. They first formed in 2003 and to date have released five singles and three albums, Bend to the Breaks, Speak Your Language, and Different Times.

Their name comes from The Jam's song "Just Who Is The Five O'Clock Hero?", which appeared on their album The Gift of 1982.

The band cite the likes of Elvis Costello, The Police, Joe Jackson and Dexys Midnight Runners as major influences, and have made a name for themselves, particularly in the UK, through charismatic and energetic live performances. Support slots with The Rakes, Brendan Benson, The Bravery, The Paddingtons, Jet and Albert Hammond Jr. have ensured their music has reached a considerable audience.

Signed in the UK to their own label Glaze Records and in Europe and Japan to PIAS, the band have received critical acclaim from the likes of NME, Drowned In Sound and musicOMH.com.

Discography 
 Bend to the Breaks, released September 18, 2006
 Speak Your Language, released July 7, 2008
 Different Times released February 15, 2011

References

External links 
 Official site
 MySpace site

Musical groups established in 2003
Musical groups from New York City
Indie rock musical groups from New York (state)
2003 establishments in New York City